Juventud del Poder Popular was the youth organization of the Colombian political movement Poder Popular during the 1980s. JPP was a member of the World Federation of Democratic Youth.

Youth wings of political parties in Colombia